Aleixo A. Sequeira (born 1958 or 1959) is an Indian politician and businessperson from Goa. He is the current member of Goa Legislative Assembly, representing the Nuvem Assembly constituency. He contested on the Indian National Congress ticket in 2022 Goa Legislative Assembly election and emerged victorious. He defeated Revolutionary Goans Party contestant, Arvind D'Costa by a margin of 4397 votes.

Early life and education
Aleixo Sequeira was born to Eusebio Antonio in Goa. He completed his graduation in Bachelor of Commerce from Bombay University in 1979. He is married to a retired service teacher and currently resides at Nuvem, Goa.

References

1950s births
Living people
Year of birth uncertain
Former members of Indian National Congress from Goa
Bharatiya Janata Party politicians from Goa
Businesspeople from Goa